Les Presses Chinoises  is a Chinese-language newspaper in Montreal, Canada.

Headquartered in Montreal,  the Chinese-language newspaper had a circulation of 15000 in Montreal and Toronto, and was owned by Crescent Chau.

In 2001 and 2002, members of the Falun Gong received injunctions against Les Presses Chinoises for the newspaper's attacks against the group. In 2003, over 200 members from Ottawa and Montreal again took the newspaper to court in Quebec, after it claimed that the practitioners "have sex with animals, commit murder, are involved in criminal activities, are saboteurs of the state of China, [and] are enemies of the state in China and Canada." A Quebec court issued a cease and desist, prohibiting the newspaper from publishing hate speech and defamation. The paper did not comply, and was facing contempt of court charges .

References

External links
 

Asian-Canadian culture in Montreal
Chinese-language newspapers published in Canada
critics of Falun Gong
newspapers published in Montreal